First President's Park is an urban park located in Almaty at the intersection of Navoi Street and Al-Farabi Avenue in the Bostandyq District in the south of the city. The park was opened in July 2010, and was named after the first President of Kazakhstan Nursultan Nazarbayev.

History
The park was founded on a section above Al-Farabi Avenue, where the lands of the former apple orchards were once located. In the collapse of the USSR, in the foothills of Alma-Ata (at that time lands of Alma-Ata oblast) the state state state farms were liquidated and the lands and orchards were abandoned. In the mid-1990s, vast areas of apple orchards were removed from state ownership and sold into private hands for next to nothing for construction. The vast tracts of former apple orchard land were divided into several plots. At the site of the future park, one of the company-owners planned to build an elite cottage community, Crystal Air Village, but in the year 2000, the contract of sale of land was terminated, and they never got to build the township on this piece of land. At a high level, it was decided to create a new Alma-Ata park on this site, initially it was called "21st Century Park".

The creation of the park began in 2001 with the first were broken main elements of the park. Greenery were planted according to dermatological plan. In honor of the participation of the city of Almaty in the Olympic torch relay of the 2008 Summer Olympics in Beijing, about a hundred spruces and birches were planted. In 2011, a hundred Tien-Shan spruces were also planted. An oak was planted personally by President Nursultan Nazarbayev in 2001.

Refinement continued to include a set of water projects in the area of 9.5 hectares and massif area on the area of 4.8 hectares. In the southern part of the park, a landscape composition is planned to be constructed, which would consist of a mountain lake and artificial bulk of the mountains (height up to 24 m). In some areas with mountainous terrain are planned to artificial sources of streams. In the middle of the park to be built Klimatron.

For a long time, the territory of the park was closed, but was eventually opened to visitors in July 2010. On 11 November 2011, the opening of the monumental and sculptural composition Kazakhstan, dedicated to the 20th anniversary of Independence Day, took place. The monument is made in the form of a golden eagle from bronze, granite and marble. In the center of the monument, there is a figure of Nazarbayev, and on the wings of a golden eagle there are symbols of the city of Almaty and Nur-Sultan. The monument is replete with images of significant architectural and historical objects of Kazakhstan.

In 2013 and 2014, repairs were carried out throughout the park.

The fountain complex consists of five bowls located at different levels. The height of the central fountain is 30 meters. In the central part there is a sculpture of a crown with medallions of the signs of the "Zodiac".

There are 3 parking zones around the park: from the side of Sadykov Street, Al-Farabi Avenue and Dulati Street.

References

Parks in Almaty